Bilsdale Midcable is a civil parish in North Yorkshire, England, which occupies the northern part of Bilsdale in the North York Moors National Park.  According to the 2001 census it had a population of 293 increasing to 332 at the 2011  Census.  Settlements in the parish are The Grange, Chop Gate (locally pron "Chop Yat"), Seave Green and Urra.  The parish also contains Bilsdale Moor, East and West.

References

Civil parishes in North Yorkshire